Cechenena catori is a moth of the  family Sphingidae that occurs in Indonesia.They are nocturnal.

References

Cechenena
Moths described in 1894